Mount Moody is a hill in the Hornby Mountains on West Falkland, in the Falkland Islands. At  metres (1,816 ft), it is the second highest of the Hornby Mountains, after Mount Maria, and the third highest on West Falkland, after Mount Maria and Mount Adam. Like the other Hornby Mountains, Mount Moody consists of a ridge running south-south-west to north-north-west in parallel to the Falkland Sound.

References

Moody